The CAFA Junior Championship (U17-20) is an international football competition in Central Asia for the member nations of the Central Asian Football Association (CAFA).

Summary

Men

U19

2016 U19

2019 U19 

09.08.2019	Afghanistan	2:2	Turkmenistan	Dushanbe Central Stadium

09.08.2019	Uzbekistan	0:2	Iran	Dushanbe Central Stadium

10.08.2019	Afghanistan	2:2	Uzbekistan	Dushanbe Central Stadium

10.08.2019	Turkmenistan	1:5	Tajikistan	Dushanbe Central Stadium

12.08.2019	Iran	4:0	Turkmenistan	Dushanbe Central Stadium

12.08.2019	Tajikistan	3:1	Afghanistan	Dushanbe Central Stadium

13.08.2019	Iran	2:0	Afghanistan	Dushanbe Central Stadium

13.08.2019	Uzbekistan	2:2	Tajikistan	Dushanbe Central Stadium

15.08.2019	Turkmenistan	0:2	Uzbekistan	Dushanbe Central Stadium

15.08.2019	Tajikistan	1:1	Iran	Dushanbe Central Stadium

Venue: Republican Central Stadium, Dushanbe, Tajikistan

Women

U18

U19

U20

2016 U19https://www.goalzz.com/main.aspx?c=16567

15-17 OCT 2016:

15 OCT:

IRI 4-1 KGZ

UZB 8-1 TJK

16 OCT:

IRI 6-0 TJK

UZB 5-0 KGZ

17 OCT: 

KGZ 1-1 TJK

UZB 3-0 IRI

References

External links
CAFA
https://www.goalzz.com/main.aspx?gr=2 - Results
https://www.goalzz.com/main.aspx?c=16567

CAFA competitions
Recurring sporting events established in 2016
2016 establishments in Asia